This is a complete listing of Major League Baseball (MLB) postseason series, grouped by franchise. Series featuring relocated teams are kept with their ultimate relocation franchises. Bolded years indicate wins. Tables are sorted first by the number of series, then the number of wins, and then alphabetically. The list only includes postseason series played since the introduction of the World Series in 1903.

Arizona Diamondbacks

Atlanta Braves

Baltimore Orioles

Boston Red Sox

Chicago Cubs

Chicago White Sox

Cincinnati Reds

Cleveland Guardians

Colorado Rockies

Detroit Tigers

Houston Astros

Kansas City Royals

Los Angeles Angels

Los Angeles Dodgers

Miami Marlins

Milwaukee Brewers

Minnesota Twins

New York Mets

New York Yankees

Oakland Athletics

Philadelphia Phillies

Pittsburgh Pirates

St. Louis Cardinals

San Diego Padres

San Francisco Giants

Seattle Mariners

Tampa Bay Rays

Texas Rangers

Toronto Blue Jays

Washington Nationals

Most frequent matchups

Notes

References

See also
List of NBA playoff series
List of NFL playoff games
List of NHL playoff series

Postseason SZ
+
World Series
American League Championship Series
National League Championship Series
American League Division Series
National League Division Series
Major League Baseball Wild Card Game